Zakir Hasan (born 1 February 1998) is a Bangladeshi cricketer who plays for Sylhet Division. He made his international debut for the Bangladesh cricket team in February 2018.

Domestic Career
Zakir made his first-class debut on 18 September 2015 in the National Cricket League. In December 2015, he was named in Bangladesh's squad for the 2016 Under-19 Cricket World Cup. He made his Twenty20 (T20) debut on 8 November 2016 playing for Chittagong Vikings in the 2016–17 Bangladesh Premier League.

In January 2018, Zakir scored 211 batting for East Zone against Central Zone, in the 2017–18 Bangladesh Cricket League, his maiden double century in first-class cricket.

Bangladesh Premier League
In October 2018, Zakir was named in the squad for the Rajshahi Kings team, following the draft for the 2018–19 Bangladesh Premier League.

International career
In February 2018, Zakir was named in Bangladesh's Twenty20 International (T20I) squad for their series against Sri Lanka. He made his T20I debut for Bangladesh against Sri Lanka on 15 February 2018.

In August 2018, Zakir was one of twelve debutants to be selected for a 31-man preliminary squad for Bangladesh ahead of the 2018 Asia Cup.

In December 2018, he was named in Bangladesh's team for the 2018 ACC Emerging Teams Asia Cup. In November 2019, he was named in Bangladesh's squad for the 2019 ACC Emerging Teams Asia Cup in Bangladesh. Later the same month, he was selected to play for the Rangpur Rangers in the 2019–20 Bangladesh Premier League, and he was named in Bangladesh's squad for the men's cricket tournament at the 2019 South Asian Games. The Bangladesh team won the gold medal, after they beat Sri Lanka by seven wickets in the final.

On 14 December 2022, during India tour of Bangladesh, he made his Test debut against India and on 17 December he scored his maiden Test century of his career while batting in the second innings of first Test. He became fourth Bangladesh player to score a century on test debut.

References

External links
 
 

1998 births
Living people
Bangladeshi cricketers
Bangladesh Test cricketers
Bangladesh Twenty20 International cricketers
Sylhet Division cricketers
Place of birth missing (living people)
Brothers Union cricketers
Bangladesh East Zone cricketers
Chattogram Challengers cricketers
South Asian Games gold medalists for Bangladesh
South Asian Games medalists in cricket
Wicket-keepers
Rupganj Tigers Cricket Club cricketers
Cricketers who made a century on Test debut